The Chicago mayoral election of 1983 was first the primary on February 22, 1983, which was followed by the general on April 12, 1983. The election saw the election of Chicago, Illinois' first African-American mayor, Harold Washington. Incumbent Mayor Jane Byrne, who had served since April 16, 1979 had lost re-nomination in the Democratic primary in a three-way race between herself, then–Congressman Washington, and then–State's Attorney Richard M. Daley (who would later become mayor six years later in 1989) in February 1983. Washington would face off against Republican nominee Bernard Epton, winning with a 3.7% lead over Epton in the general election.

Nominations
 The Democratic Party and Republican Party held their primaries on February 22. 77.5% of registered voters voted in the primaries.

Democratic primary

Campaigning

Since winning an upset victory in the 1979 Democratic primary and a landslide victory in that year's general election, Jane Byrne had had a tumultuous term as mayor. Nevertheless, she had secured support for her renomination from 33 of the city's aldermen. A three-way race emerged between Byrne, congressman Harold Washington, and Cook County State's Attorney Richard M. Daley (the son of former mayor Richard J. Daley). Two months ahead of the primary, the Democratic Party organization endorsed Byrne. Of the candidates, Byrne's campaign had the most funds, raising more than $3 million. She had been spending much of her funds very early on television commercials to overhaul her image, attempting to transform her image to that of a steady and serious figure who had straightened out what had been a chaotic city government. While Byrne had previously, in 1979, presented herself as a protegee of former mayor Richard J. Daley, she now blamed him for many of the city's financial shortcomings. Daley's own son Richard M. Daley capitalized off a desire which many Chicagoans held (despite Byrne's criticisms) to return to what they perceived to have been comparatively stable years which the city had experienced under Richard J. Daley's leadership. However, the younger Daley struggled with a perception that he was a lightweight compared to his father.  There was also a perception at the time that the younger Daley held an inferior intellect to those of his opponents. When Daley officially launched his campaign in September 1982, polls showed him ahead of or tied with Byrne. A voting bloc which was sought after were the independent-leaning Democrats often called "lakefront liberals". They had backed Byrne in her 1979 primary, but were hesitant to back her again.

Much of the city's white electorate was split between Byrne and Daley. The fact that neither Byrne nor Daley were able to consolidate the white electorate around their candidacy provided Washington an opportunity to win a plurality of the overall vote. While Washington was anticipated to do well among African-American voters, he would not have been able to capture the nomination on African-American support alone. The Democratic Party leadership itself sought to block Washington's victory. Chairman Edward Vrdolyak was alleged to have encouraged voters to back Byrne, warning that a vote for Daley was a vote for Washington. In the closing days of the campaign, Byrne was on the defense, particularly from attacks being lodged by Daley. Daley, meanwhile, was struggling to convince voters that he was no longer in third place. Washington entered the television ad campaign later than the other candidates, citing only having barely $1 million to spend on his campaign. Byrne spent a total of $10 million on her campaign, $5 million more than her 1979 campaign. Daley won the endorsements of both of the city's major newspapers.

The Chicago Tribune and the Chicago Sun-Times both endorsed Daley.

Endorsements

Results
The election was held on Tuesday, February 22, 1983. Turnout was 77.5%. Washington received 36.3% of the citywide vote and roughly 80% of the African-American vote. 1.2 million Chicagoans went to polls to cast their ballot, noted then as the largest turnout since 25 years earlier in 1958. Mayor Byrne had 33.6% of the citywide vote and Daley came in third place with 29.7%. The election saw a record-setting 69% of registered African-American voter turnout.

|- bgcolor="#E9E9E9" align="center"
! colspan="5" rowspan="1" align="center" |1983 Chicago Democratic Party Mayoral Primary
|- bgcolor="#E9E9E9" align="center"
! colspan="2" rowspan="1" align="left" | Candidate
! width="75" | Votes
! width="30" | %
! width="45" | +/-
|-
| bgcolor="#3333FF" |
| align="left" | Harold Washington
|  
| %
| N/A
|-
| bgcolor="#3333FF" |
| align="left" | Jane Byrne (incumbent)
|  
| %
| -12.6%
|-
| bgcolor="#3333FF" |
| align="left" | Richard M. Daley
|  
| %
| N/A
|-
| bgcolor="#3333FF" |
| align="left" | Frank R. Ranallo
|  
| %
| N/A
|-
| bgcolor="#3333FF" |
| align="left" | William Markowski
|  
| %
| N/A
|-
| bgcolor="#3333FF" |
| align="left" | Sheila Jones
| 
| %
| N/A
|-
| colspan="2" align="left" | Majority
|  
| %
| +0.6%
|-
| colspan="2" align="left" | Total
|  || %
| N/A
|-
|}

Republican primary
Former State Representative Bernard Epton won the Republican nomination. Epton had reluctantly run after being urged by party leaders. He was the only established figure who agreed to seek the nomination, and had all but formally secured the nomination at party meetings in November. Chicago had not elected a Republican mayor in 56 years (since the 1927 Chicago mayoral election). At the time, Chicago had no Republican aldermen on its City Council.  While Chicago was regarded as overwhelmingly Democratic, it was hoped by many Republicans that if Washington were nominated by the Democrats, many white voters would vote for the Republican nominee. Epton stated, "Chicago has been regarded for too long as a Democratic stronghold. It's about time we change that image." Candidates Ralph G. Medly, William Arthur Murray, and Raymond Wardingley saw their names removed from the ballot due to issues with their petitions. Wardingly had been a candidate in the previous election's primary.

Independent candidates
Ed Warren ran as an independent candidate.

General election

Campaigning

James Fletcher, who ran James R. Thompson's first successful gubernatorial campaign, became Epton's general election campaign manager. High-profile figures such as Republican Senator Paul Laxalt (chairman of the RNC) campaigned for Epton. The race was particularly competitive, with some newspapers characterizing it as a "tossup". Epton was polling double what a Republican typically polled in Chicago mayoral races. Epton received endorsements from some Democratic Ward Committeemen, such as Ed Kelly.

Byrne briefly explored running as a write-in candidate during the general election, before dropping the idea due to a number of complicating factors.

The Chicago Tribune and the Chicago Sun-Times both endorsed Washington.

Endorsements

Results
The election saw a massive voter turnout, with more than 82 percent of eligible voters casting ballots.

Results by ward
Washington's coalition of voters consisted of the city's African American population with the additional support of "lakefront liberals" and the city's Latino community. Therefore, he performed best in heavily black wards, as well as lakeshore wards and heavily Latino wards.

Epton carried a plurality of the vote in 28 of the city's 50 wards, while Washington carried a plurality of the vote in 22 wards.

References

External links 
 Our Campaigns – Chicago Mayor – D Primary Race – Feb 22, 1983
 Our Campaigns – Chicago Mayor Race – Apr 12, 1983
 Our Campaigns – Chicago Mayor – D Primary Race – Feb 27, 1979

1983
Chicago
1983 Illinois elections
1980s in Chicago
1983 in Illinois
Richard M. Daley